José Alberto Quiñónez Navarro (born July 28, 1990) is a Mexican mixed martial artist who competes in the Bantamweight division. He was one of the cast members in The Ultimate Fighter: Latin America 1, The Ultimate Fighter  UFC TV reality show in August 2014, He formerly competed in the Ultimate Fighting Championship (UFC).

Background
Quiñónez was born in Tlaltenango de Sánchez Román in the state of Zacatecas, Mexico. He was interested and involved in soccer when he was young  where he tried out for  Estudiantes Tecos and Pachuca soccer teams. He transitioned to train in mixed martial arts when he was a teenager together with his brother Cristian "Taylon" Quiñónez, starting out in boxing and jiu jitsu and later in MMA. Quiñónez got the entrance to UFC when he was selected as the one of the contestants in The Ultimate Fighter: Latin America 1, The Ultimate Fighter UFC TV reality series.

Quiñónez was a waiter prior becoming a professional MMA fighter.

Mixed martial arts career

Early career 
Quiñónez fought all his fights in the Mexico circuit and amassed a record of 3-1 prior joining UFC.

The Ultimate Fighter: Latin America 1 
Quiñónez was selected as one of the contestants for the Bantamweight division of The Ultimate Fighter: Latin America 1, The Ultimate Fighter UFC TV reality series, under Team Cain Velasquez in August 2014.

In elimination round, Quiñónez defeated Bentley Syler by TKO in round one. He next faced Marco Beltrán in the semifinals and won by unanimous decision. He moved on to face Alejandro Pérez  on UFC 180 for the title belt.

Ultimate Fighting Championship 

Quiñónez made his promotional debut on November 15, 2014 at UFC 180. He faced Alejandro Pérez in the finals for The Ultimate Fighter: Latin America 1 in Mexico City, Mexico. He was defeated by Pérez via unanimous decision with the score board of (29-26, 29-26, 28-27).

He next faced Leonardo Morales on June 6, 2015 at UFC Fight Night: Boetsch vs. Henderson. He submitted Morales at 2:34 minutes into round one via rear-naked choke. After the fight, Quiñónez stated he would not want to fight another Latinos again as the promotion cut Morales from the roster after Morales lost the fight to him.

After a 15 months hiatus due to a knee injury, Quiñónez returned to face Joey Gomez on September 17, 2016 at UFC Fight Night: Poirier vs. Johnson. After three round bout, Quiñónez outpointed Gomez and the judges awarded the win to Quiñónez via unanimous decision (29-28, 30-27, 30-27).

Quiñónez faced Diego Rivas in UFC Fight Night: Pettis vs. Moreno on August 5, 2017. He won the fight by unanimous decision.

Quiñónez faced Teruto Ishihara on February 10, 2018 at UFC 221. He won the fight via unanimous decision.

Quiñónez was scheduled to face Sean O'Malley on October 6, 2018 at UFC 229. However, O'Malley was pulled from the fight on September 30 after failing a USADA drug test. In turn, promotion officials elected to remove Quiñónez from the card and he will be rescheduled for a future event.

Quiñónez faced Nathaniel Wood on 16 March 2019 at UFC Fight Night 147. He lost the fight via a rear-naked choke submission in the second round.

Quiñónez faced Carlos Huachin on September 21, 2019 at UFC on ESPN+ 17. He won the fight by unanimous decision.

Quiñónez faced Sean O'Malley on March 7, 2020 at UFC 248. He lost the fight via TKO in the first round.

Quiñónez was scheduled to face Louis Smolka on November 14, 2020 at UFC Fight Night 182. At the weigh-ins, Smolka weighed in at 139 pounds, three pounds over the bantamweight non-title fight limit. The bout will proceed at catchweight and Smolka was fined 20 percent of his purse, which will go to Quiñónez. Smolka pulled out of their fights the next day as consequence of the weigh-cut and those bouts were canceled.  The bout was left intact and eventually took place at UFC on ESPN 19 on December 5, 2020.  Quiñónez lost the fight via technical knockout in round two.

On March 2, 2021, it was announced that Quiñónez was released from the UFC.

Post UFC 
Quiñónez faced Andre Soukhamthath at XFC 44 on May 28, 2021. He won the bout via unanimous decision.

Personal life 

Quiñónez grew up in a "tough" neighborhood, as he has declared. Although, he never liked violence, and he always stayed out of trouble. He practiced football and soccer during all his childhood, until he was a teenager, where he started training boxing.

His moniker " El Teco" coined after now defunct "Estudiantes Tecos" football team in Mexico.

Quiñónez distinctive mustache was the idea came from his friend and UFC fighter Yair Rodriguez, where now he has shaved it to signify a restart of his MMA career.

Quiñónez looks up to Dominick Cruz, who he trains with at Alliance MMA gym in California, where he stated he wanted to achieve the level of fighting skills and to adopt the philosophy that of Cruz's. His hobbies are reading, and hiking in nature: Exploring lakes, mountains, forests.

Mixed martial arts record

|-
|Win
|align=center|9–5
|Andre Soukhamthath
|Decision (unanimous)
|XFC 44
|
|align=center|3
|align=center|5:00
|Des Moines, Iowa, United States
|
|-
|Loss
|align=center|8–5
|Louis Smolka
|TKO (punches)
|UFC on ESPN: Hermansson vs. Vettori
|
|align=center|2
|align=center|2:15
|Las Vegas, Nevada, United States
|
|-
|Loss
|align=center|8–4
|Sean O'Malley
|TKO (head kick and punches)
|UFC 248
|
|align=center|1
|align=center|2:02
|Las Vegas, Nevada, United States
|
|-
|Win
|align=center|8–3
|Carlos Huachin
|Decision (unanimous)
|UFC Fight Night: Rodríguez vs. Stephens 
|
|align=center|3
|align=center|5:00
|Mexico City, Mexico
|
|-
|Loss
|align=center|7–3
|Nathaniel Wood  
|Submission (rear-naked choke)
|UFC Fight Night: Till vs. Masvidal 
|
|align=center|2
|align=center|2:46
|London, England
|
|-
|Win
|align=center|7–2
|Teruto Ishihara
|Decision (unanimous)
|UFC 221 
|
|align=center|3
|align=center|5:00
|Perth, Australia
|
|-
|Win
|align=center| 6–2
|Diego Rivas
|Decision (unanimous)
|UFC Fight Night: Pettis vs. Moreno
|
|align=center|3
|align=center|5:00
|Mexico City, Mexico
|
|-
| Win
| align=center| 5–2
| Joey Gomez
| Decision (unanimous)
| UFC Fight Night: Poirier vs. Johnson
| 
| align=center| 3
| align=center| 5:00
| Hidalgo, Texas, United States
|
|-
| Win
| align=center| 4–2
| Leonardo Morales
| Submission (rear-naked choke)
| UFC Fight Night: Boetsch vs. Henderson
| 
| align=center| 1
| align=center| 2:34
| New Orleans, Louisiana, United States
| 
|-
| Loss
| align=center| 3–2
| Alejandro Pérez
| Decision (unanimous)
| UFC 180
| 
| align=center|3
| align=center| 5:00
| Mexico City, Mexico
|
|-
| Loss
| align=center| 3–1
| Davi Ramos
| TKO (punches)
| Extreme Fight Academy: Mexico vs. Brazil
| 
| align=center| 1
| align=center| 2:38
| Tuxtla Gutierrez, Mexico
|
|-
| Win
| align=center| 3–0
| Jorge Gamboa
| TKO (punches)
| Combate Extremo: Teco vs. Gamboa
| 
| align=center| 1
| align=center| 2:25
| Monterrey, Mexico
|
|-
| Win
| align=center| 2–0
| Alejandro Pérez
| Decision (unanimous)
|  Fight Club Mexico 3
| 
| align=center| 3
| align=center| 5:00
| Aguscalientes, Mexico
|
|-
| Win
| align=center| 1–0
| Alexis Gallardo
| TKO (punches)
| Fight Club Mexico 2
| 
| align=center| 1
| align=center| 1:31
| Mexico
|
|-

See also
 List of male mixed martial artists

References

External links
 
 

Living people
1990 births
Mexican male mixed martial artists
Bantamweight mixed martial artists
Mixed martial artists utilizing boxing
Mixed martial artists utilizing wrestling
Mixed martial artists utilizing Brazilian jiu-jitsu
Mexican practitioners of Brazilian jiu-jitsu
Sportspeople from Zacatecas
Ultimate Fighting Championship male fighters